Plaisance of Antioch (1235/1236 or ca. 1235 – September 27/22, 1261) was Queen of Cyprus by marriage to  King Henry I. She served as regent of the kingdoms of Cyprus and Jerusalem for their son, King Hugh II, in 1254–1261 and 1258–1261 respectively.

Biography
She was a daughter of Bohemund V of Antioch and his second spouse, the Italian noblewoman Lucienne of Segni, a relative of Pope Innocent III. 

She was firstly married in 1250 to King Henry I of Cyprus, who died in 1253. Their son, the infant Hugh II, became King of Cyprus with Plaisance as regent. Plaisance re-married to Balian of Arsuf, the son of John of Arsuf, but they divorced and had the marriage annulled in 1258.

The official King of Jerusalem at the time was the absentee Conrad of Hohenstaufen, who died in 1254, with his title passing to his son Conradin, also still in Germany. The position of regent belonged by birthright to the underage Hugh, who was Conradin's immediate heir and hereditarily the next king if Conradin failed to have his own progeny. In 1258, Plaisance's brother Bohemund VI of Antioch brought Hugh and Plaisance to Acre and demanded that they be recognized as King of Jerusalem and regent, respectively. John of Ibelin (count of Jaffa), the Knights Templar, and the Teutonic Knights agreed with this, against the opposition of the Knights Hospitaller and various jurists who still wished to recognize Conradin as king, even though he was not present in the kingdom.

Plaisance, supported by a majority of the nobles, was accepted as acting regent and then appointed her former father-in-law John of Arsuf to rule as bailiff in her place; he had already been bailiff before her arrival and both Bohemund and John of Jaffa had hoped the presence of Plaisance and Hugh would eliminate the need for another bailiff. The dispute, however, continued and Pope Alexander IV sent the Genoese to attempt to settle it; John of Jaffa convinced Bohemund and Plaisance to unite Jerusalem, Antioch, and Tripoli against them. In 1260 the high cleric (a future pope) Jacques Pantaleon arrived to take up the vacant patriarchate, hoping to solve the crisis. Around this time Plaisance apparently became John of Jaffa's mistress, against the new patriarch's wishes. Pope Urban may have issued a papal bull to Plaisance expressing his disapproval of her relationship, Audi filia et.

Plaisance died at Cyprus in 1261 and the regency of Hugh II passed to Hugh of Antioch-Lusignan, while the regency of Jerusalem passed to her sister-in-law Isabella, who was the sister of Plaisance's late husband. However, Hugh II died in 1267 before reaching adulthood, and was succeeded by Hugh of Antioch who reigned until 1284.

References 

Cypriot queens consort
13th-century people of the Kingdom of Jerusalem
13th-century women rulers
13th-century viceregal rulers
1235 births
1261 deaths
13th-century Cypriot people
Regents of Jerusalem
Regents of Cyprus
Women of the Crusader states
Queen mothers